The Liberty Belle (formerly Richard F. Irvine) is a steam-powered riverboat ride vehicle at Rivers of America, Walt Disney World. It was the second boat ride vehicle to be introduced in this attraction and originally named after the late Disney executive Richard F. Irvine.
It was a steam powered sternwheeler replica.

History
The Richard F. Irvine Riverboat was the second riverboat to enter into service on May 20, 1973 in the Rivers of America at the Magic Kingdom park. Its other riverboat colleague, the Admiral Joe Fowler, served from October 2, 1971, through fall 1980 when it was destroyed in a dry dock accident. The Richard F. Irvine was completely refurbished and returned to service in 1996 as the Liberty Belle Riverboat. The Liberty Belle underwent an extensive rehab from September 2005 to September 2006 and returned as an attraction ride vehicle in Rivers of America. In 2018, the Liberty Belle was completely overhauled with a new boiler.

One of the ferry boats that travel between the Magic Kingdom and the Transportation and Ticket Center is now named the Richard F. Irvine, having been renamed from Magic Kingdom II in 1997.

See also
Disney riverboats

References

External links

Official website

Former Walt Disney Parks and Resorts attractions
Walt Disney Parks and Resorts gentle boat rides
Liberty Square (Magic Kingdom)
Paddle steamers of the United States